Milenka Peña is a television and radio journalist, producer and broadcaster in the Chicago area, also well known in many Latin-American countries. She is also a writer and a public speaker, participating as a key-note speaker in national and international events and conferences.

Biography
Milenka Peña began her career in broadcasting communications, music and acting at a very early age in Bolivia, her native country, making her debut as an entertainer and performer on both national and international levels since she was only four years old.

Years later, while completing her professional studies in Broadcasting Communications and Journalism, Milenka continued her career as the producer, anchor and on-air host of several well-known radio and television programs, as well as hosting a variety of events and contributing as a writer to magazines and newspapers.

In 1997 Milenka became a member of the News Department of Telemundo Chicago, the Hispanic branch of the NBC Network. Years later she became the Main News Anchor.

She was the recipient of many important recognitions, among them, Emmy Award nominations for Outstanding Achievement for Individual Excellence in Camera and Best News Anchor, given by the National Academy of Television Arts and Sciences. She also received the coveted Silver Dome Award by the Illinois News Broadcasters Association.

Currently Milenka is the Senior News Editor for Digital Trends Español, the leading consumer technology publisher for the Spanish-speaking market. The site’s yearly active user base climbed to 15 million readers, gaining over 30 million page views in less than a year. Peña has also worked as an independent professional on projects and productions with many international organizations. She was one of the main guest hosts of Focus on the Family’s Spanish radio show, reaching daily an international audience of more than 50 million people, as well as a contributor writer to multiple publications. She is a Harper Collins published author, and a keynote speaker in national and international events and conferences. She hosts her own syndicated radio show "Apasionante con Milenka Peña".

Peña worked as the Continental Media Director of Global Freedom Concepts and El Instituto para la Cultura Financiera, organizations dedicated to equip people worldwide to learn, apply, and teach solid principles about wholesome financial administration. Milenka also worked as the Coordinator of the Spanish Broadcasting of Moody Radio Chicago, as well as directing and hosting “Nuevo Pulso con Milenka Peña”, a weekly radio show that focuses on issues currently facing the Latino culture. The program also offers music, humor, contests and interviews with relevant guests, providing the Hispanic audience with a family-friendly alternative.

Milenka is married to Van DenHartog since 1995. They have two sons, Brandon and Dylan.

External links and references 

Milenka joins Digital Trends as Senior News Editor
 Article about outstanding Bolivian immigrants around the world. - From the book Bolivianos en el Mundo by international journalist Edwin Perez Uberhuaga
  Enlace Bolivia: "Destacados" - Article about Bolivian child stars and TV shows
  "Bolivianas Científicas, Artistas, Políticas y Periodistas Triunfan en EEUU" - Article about famous Bolivian women and their achievements in the USA
  "Teleguia Chicago - Chismes Candentes del Espectáculo" - Spanish TV Guide - Gossip and News
 Chicago Sun-Times article about Telemundo News Anchors.
Milenka Hosts "Nuevo Pulso"

Milenka joins Moody Radio Chicago

New Addition to GFC - Milenka Peña as Continental Media Director

American television journalists
Year of birth missing (living people)
Living people
American women television journalists
American radio journalists
American women radio journalists
20th-century American journalists
21st-century American journalists
Bolivian emigrants to the United States
20th-century American women
21st-century American women